Number 58 Squadron was a squadron of the Royal Air Force.

History

First World War 
No. 58 Squadron was first formed at Cramlington, Northumberland, on 8 June 1916 as a squadron of the Royal Flying Corps from a nucleus split off from the Home defence 36 Squadron, equipped with Royal Aircraft Factory B.E.2c and B.E.2e aircraft and serving as an advanced training unit.

The squadron converted to Royal Aircraft Factory F.E.2bs in the night bombing role at Dover in December 1917 and prepared for deployment overseas, moving to France on 10 January 1918, and flying its first operational mission, a bombing attack on an airfield at Rumbeke on the night of 2/3 February 1918. The squadron attacked German road and railway targets during the German spring offensive in March–April 1918 to disrupt the German advance. In August 1918, the squadron flew nightbombing missions in support of the Allied offensive at the Second Battle of Bapaume. In September 1918 the squadron replaced its F.E.2s with the much larger twin-engine Handley Page O/400, although its airfield at Alquines was not ideal for the large bomber, having poor operating surfaces and awkward approaches. It flew its first mission with the O/400 on the night of 20–21 September, and discarded its last F.E.2s on 3 October. By the end of the First World War the squadron had dropped 247 tons of bombs and fired over 400,000 rounds of ammunition while strafing ground targets. In 1919 the squadron moved to Egypt, with the move completed by 2 July. It started to reequip with Vickers Vimy bombers, but was renumbered as No. 70 Squadron before it disposed of all its O/400s.

Between the wars 
58 Squadron was reformed on 1 April 1924 as a heavy bomber unit equipped with the Vimy at RAF Worthy Down on training duties. From December 1924, it replaced its Vimys with Vickers Virginia bombers and in 1925 it was commanded by Squadron Leader Arthur Harris, later Air Marshal "Bomber" Harris. The squadron, still equipped with the Virginia, moved to RAF Upper Heyford on 13 January 1936 and to RAF Driffield on 31 August that year. Steps finally began to be taken to replace its obsolete Virginia biplanes in February 1937 when it received a few Avro Ansons to prepare its crews for more modern monoplanes with retractable undercarriages. It moved to RAF Boscombe Down on 24 March 1937 and began to re-equip with Armstrong Whitworth Whitleys in October that year (although shortages of Whitleys resulted in it temporarily receiving a few Handley Page Heyfords in April 1939.

Second World War 

At the start of the Second World War 58 Squadron was based at RAF Linton-on-Ouse flying Whitley bombers as part of No. 4 Group RAF in RAF Bomber Command, flying its first mission of the war, a leaflet raid on the Ruhr, on the night of 3/4 September 1939. From October 1939 until February 1940 it was based at RAF Boscombe Down attached to Coastal Command carrying out convoy escort patrols. The squadron then returned in February 1940 to Linton-on-Ouse as part of Bomber Command and remained there for the next two years, undertaking its first bombing raid on the night of 18/19 April 1940, when three Whitleys set out to attack Fornebu airfield, Oslo, with one aborting and two attacking the target. In April 1942, the squadron transferred to Coastal Command. The squadron flew a total of 1,757 sorties in 227 operations (219 bombing raids and 8 leaflet raids) during its time in Bomber Command, losing 49 aircraft on operations.

The squadron was based at RAF St Eval and flew anti-submarine patrols over the Western Approaches as part of No. 19 Group RAF. On 23 June 1942, a Whitley of 58 Squadron attacked the German submarine  in the Bay of Biscay, badly damaging the submarine. At the end of August 1942 the squadron moved to RAF Stornoway in the Western Isles. On 15 September 1942 a 58 Squadron Whitley sank the German submarine  near the Rosemary Bankwest of Scotland. In December 1942, the squadron moved to RAF Holmsley South in Hampshire, converting to the Handley Page Halifax in January 1943.

On 11 May 1943, a Halifax of 58 Squadron spotted the German submarine  in the Bay of Biscay and attacked with depth-charges. The submarine was subsequently attacked by the sloop  and sunk, with the Halifax and Fleetwood being jointly credited with sinking the U-Boat. On 15 May another 58 Squadron Halifax caught a U-Boat on the surface in the Bay of Biscay, sinking .

In October 1944 the squadron switched from anti-submarine duties to anti-shipping duties, carrying out attacks on German shipping off the coast of Norway. It was disbanded on 25 May 1945.

Post-war operations 

In October 1946, No. 58 Squadron reformed at RAF Benson in the photo-reconnaissance role, mainly operating Mosquitoes. In March 1953, the squadron  moved to RAF Wyton operating Mosquitos. Late in 1953 the squadron was re-equipped with the English Electric Canberra PR.3. In 1953/54, the Canberras made a record breaking flight from Wyton to New Zealand via Egypt, India & Singapore, completing the journey in 24 hours. Two aircraft also made the trip to USA for the 50th anniversary celebration of the Wright brother's flight. These were replaced by Canberra PR.7s in 1955 which took part in the Operation Grapple hydrogen bomb tests at Christmas Island in the Pacific, and also were deployed to British Honduras to face a threat by Guatemala to overfly the country during an official visit by Princess Margaret.

The Radar Reconnaissance Flight was created by splitting off an element of the squadron on 1 October 1951 while at Benson, it used Lincolns, Hastings and Victors until it was disbanded on 1 November 1963 at Gaydon

During the Suez Crisis, No. 58 Squadron forward deployed to RAF Akrotiri, Cyprus. On 6 November 1956, Canberra PR.7 WH799 departed from Akrotiri to overfly Syria to assess the build up of Soviet equipment in the country. While over Syria, WH799 was intercepted and was shot down by a Syrian Air Force Gloster Meteor, killing the navigator while the pilot ejected and safely landed in Lebanon. As of 2021, this was the last RAF aircraft shot down in an enemy air-to-air engagement.

The squadron disbanded on 30 September 1970. It was reformed at RAF Wittering in 1973 as a ground-attack training unit equipped with Hawker Hunters before being finally disbanded in 1976.

References

Citations

Bibliography 

 Royal Air Force History: History of No. 58 Squadron
 Air of Authority: No 56 – 60 Squadron Histories

058 Squadron
058 Squadron
Military units and formations established in 1916
Military units and formations disestablished in 1976
1916 establishments in the United Kingdom